The "Disney Vault" was a term formerly used by The Walt Disney Company for its policy of regularly placing sales moratoria on home video releases of specific animated feature films. Each Walt Disney Animation Studios film was available for purchase for a limited time, and then placed "in the vault", unavailable for retail sales, pending some future re-release.

Following the acquisition of 21st Century Fox by Disney and the launch of the streaming service Disney+ in 2019, the notion of the Disney Vault has been used by journalists to describe practices by Walt Disney Studios restricting many more back-catalogue theatrical films from cinema screenings.

History 
This is the modern version of Disney's practice of re-releasing its animated films in theaters every several years, which began with the reissue of Snow White and the Seven Dwarfs in 1944. During the 1980s, when the home video market was dominated by VHS systems, Disney films would be reissued every ten years, a time gap equal to that of their theatrical reissues. The moratorium period was continued with the evolution of home media delivery mechanisms, including DVD, Blu-ray, and digital streaming, which Disney itself mainly markets through its own Movies Anywhere initiative. Television commercials for Disney home video releases will alert customers that certain films will be placed on moratorium soon, urging them to purchase these films before they "go back into the Disney Vault", in the words often spoken by longtime Disney trailer voice-over actor Mark Elliot. Some direct-to-video Disney films, among them Bambi II, have also been released with a pre-established window of availability.

Dumbo and Alice in Wonderland were among the first movies to be released on home video. Earlier, they were among the first Disney animated films aired on television. They had been chosen to premiere as part of ABC's Walt Disney's Disneyland in 1954 to promote Disneyland and its two prominent rides based on these films. Disney has kept this "tradition" by having them permanently released to the public. Disney has never vaulted these two films because they have become so saturated in the market that vaulting them would have been meaningless. Nonetheless, they have been very successful on home video, equivalent to that of the Disney Vault movies. Near the end of the 2000s, they were released on both Platinum and Diamond editions. They were only released on a special edition with similar marketing to the Disney Vault movies. They are available on digital and occasionally on certain streaming devices, but are hard to find in stores. Disney released a Blu-ray/digital copy combo pack of the films, but only as a Disney Movie Club (DMC) exclusive, which was not released to the public. In 2018, Disney ceased to sell these editions to DMC members, and instead offers the regular Blu-rays as an option. With the release of the Signature Collection in 2016, Disney released three movies per year instead of two. By 2022, all of the films that were vaulted had been fully released.

When Disney's streaming service and namesake Disney+ was announced in 2019, Disney CEO Bob Iger revealed that the service will contain Disney's entire film library, which would de facto retire the concept of the Disney Vault as a home video control device. However, a separate practice restricting repertory screenings of films from the Disney back-catalogue remains in effect. Following Disney's purchase of 21st Century Fox for its entertainment assets, Disney withdrew the Fox film library from distribution to theaters (with the notable exception of The Rocky Horror Picture Show), effectively placing the Fox back-catalog in the Vault.

Controls 
The Walt Disney Company itself stated that this process was done to both control their market and to allow Disney films to be fresh for new generations of young children. A side-effect of the moratorium process was the fact that videos and DVDs of Disney films placed on moratorium become collectibles, sold in stores and at auction websites such as eBay for sums in excess of their original suggested retail price. The practice also had made the Disney films a prime target for bootleg DVD manufacturers.

Films 
The following films were considered to be subject to release and later return to the Disney Vault.

Main features 
 Snow White and the Seven Dwarfs (1937)
 Pinocchio (1940)
 Fantasia (1940)
 Dumbo (1941)
 Bambi (1942)
 Cinderella (1950)
 Alice in Wonderland (1951)
 Peter Pan (1953)
 Lady and the Tramp (1955)
 Sleeping Beauty (1959)
 101 Dalmatians (1961)
 The Jungle Book (1967)
 Oliver & Company (1988)
 The Little Mermaid (1989)
 Beauty and the Beast (1991)
 Aladdin (1992)
 The Lion King (1994)
 Pocahontas (1995)
 Toy Story (1995)
 The Hunchback of Notre Dame (1996)
 Hercules (1997)
 Mulan (1998)
 Tarzan (1999)
 Tangled (2010)

Sequels
 The Return of Jafar (1994)
 Aladdin and the King of Thieves (1996)
 Beauty and the Beast: The Enchanted Christmas (1997)
 Belle's Magical World (1998)
 Pocahontas II: Journey to a New World (1998)
 The Lion King II: Simba's Pride (1998)
 Hercules: Zero to Hero (1999)
 Toy Story 2 (1999)
 Fantasia 2000 (1999)
 The Little Mermaid II: Return to the Sea (2000)
 Lady and the Tramp II: Scamp's Adventure (2001)
 Return to Never Land (2002)
 The Hunchback of Notre Dame II (2002)
 Cinderella II: Dreams Come True (2002)
 101 Dalmatians II: Patch's London Adventure (2003)
 The Jungle Book 2 (2003)
 The Lion King 1½ (2004)
 Mulan II (2004)
 Tarzan II (2005)
 Bambi II (2006)
 Cinderella III: A Twist in Time (2007)
 The Little Mermaid: Ariel's Beginning (2008)
 Toy Story 3 (2010)
 Toy Story 4 (2019)

See also 

 Artificial scarcity
 Moratorium (entertainment)
 Direct-to-video

References 

Disney Consumer Products
Disney jargon
The Walt Disney Company
Home video
Retail processes and techniques
Scarcity